Willisville is a village in Perry County, Illinois, United States. The population was 633 at the 2010 census.

Geography
Willisville is located at  (37.983687, -89.590506).

Demographics

As of the census of 2000, there were 694 people, 270 households, and 194 families residing in the village. The racial makeup of the village was 99.57% White, 0.14% Native American, and 0.29% from two or more races. Hispanic or Latino of any race were 0.86% of the population.

There were 270 households, out of which 36.7% had children under the age of 18 living with them, 53.3% were married couples living together, 13.0% had a female householder with no husband present, and 28.1% were non-families. 24.8% of all households were made up of individuals, and 13.7% had someone living alone who was 65 years of age or older. The average household size was 2.57 and the average family size was 3.04.

In the village, the population was spread out, with 27.4% under the age of 18, 9.7% from 18 to 24, 27.5% from 25 to 44, 20.7% from 45 to 64, and 14.7% who were 65 years of age or older. The median age was 35 years. For every 100 females, there were 94.9 males. For every 100 females age 18 and over, there were 86.0 males.

The median income for a household in the village was $31,000, and the median income for a family was $35,667. Males had a median income of $27,386 versus $21,548 for females. The per capita income for the village was $12,832. About 15.4% of families and 17.8% of the population were below the poverty line, including 24.9% of those under age 18 and 8.7% of those age 65 or over.
In the early 1990s local coal mines closed resulting in major job loses for the region.

Notable person

 Vince Castino, catcher for the Chicago White Sox

References

External links
 Early Photographs of Willisville, Illinois

Villages in Perry County, Illinois
Villages in Illinois